State Highway 79 (abbreviated SH-79 or OK-79) is a state highway in Jefferson County, Oklahoma. It has no lettered spur routes.

SH-79 was first commissioned in 1938, and has had the same route since then.

Route description
Oklahoma's State Highway 79 begins where Texas's State Highway 79 crosses over the Red River from Clay County, Texas into Jefferson County, Oklahoma. The bridge over the river is a multiple-span pony truss bridge. Upon reaching the shore, the highway continues on a northeast trajectory, rising out of the Red River valley. The highway then comes to an end at US-70 on the southwest outskirts of Waurika.

History
State Highway 79 is first shown on the April 1939 state highway map. It has the same extent on that map as it does today, although it had a dirt surface. By 1941, the whole route had been upgraded to asphalt.

Junction list

References

External links

 SH-79 at Roadklahoma

079
Transportation in Jefferson County, Oklahoma